Malacothamnus arcuatus is a species of flowering plant in the mallow family known by the common name arcuate bushmallow. It is endemic to the San Francisco Peninsula, where it is a rare species. It has a California Rare Plant Rank of 1B.2 (Plants rare, threatened, or endangered in California and elsewhere). Malacothamnus arcuatus is occasionally treated within Malacothamnus fasciculatus.

References

External links
Calflora Profile: Malacothamnus arcuatus
'' Photo gallery at Calphotos

Flora of California
Endemic flora of California
arcuatus
Natural history of San Mateo County, California
Natural history of Santa Clara County, California
Natural history of Santa Cruz County, California
Flora without expected TNC conservation status